Baumholder station is a railway station in the municipality of Baumholder, located in the Birkenfeld district in Rhineland-Palatinate, Germany.

References

Railway stations in Rhineland-Palatinate
Buildings and structures in Birkenfeld (district)
Railway stations in Germany opened in 1912